Tilman Esslinger is a German experimental physicist. He is Professor at ETH Zurich, Switzerland, and works in the field of ultracold quantum gases and optical lattices.

Biography
Tilman Esslinger received his PhD in physics from the University of Munich and the Max Planck Institute of Quantum Optics, Germany, in 1995. In his doctoral research he worked under the supervision of Theodor Hänsch on subrecoil laser cooling and optical lattices. He then build up his own group in Hänsch’s lab and conducted pioneering work on atom lasers, observed long-range phase coherence in a Bose–Einstein condensate, and realized the superfluid to Mott-insulator transition with a Bose gas in an optical lattice. Following his habilitation, Esslinger was in October 2001 appointed full professor at ETH Zurich, Switzerland, where he pioneered one-dimensional atomic quantum gases, Fermi–Hubbard models with atoms, a quantum-gas analogue of the topological Haldane model  and the merger of quantum gas experiments with cavity quantum electrodynamics.

Research
The work of Esslinger and his group has stimulated an interdisciplinary exchange between the condensed-matter and quantum-gas communities. Recent notable results include the development of a quantum simulator for graphene, setting up of a cavity-optomechanical system in which the Dicke quantum phase transition to a superradiant state has been observed for the first time, as well as creation of a cold-atom analogue of mesoscopic conductors and observation of the onset of superfluidity in that system. Esslinger received a Phillip Morris Research Prize (shared with Theodor Hänsch and Immanuel Bloch) in 2000 and currently holds an ERC advanced grant. He is an author on more than 80 peer-reviewed journal articles, which have been cited more than 8000 times (as of March 2013).

References

External links

Group homepage

Quantum physicists
21st-century German physicists
Academic staff of ETH Zurich
Living people
Year of birth missing (living people)
Fellows of the American Physical Society